A referendum on the Paris Agreement was held in Mayotte on 2 July 2000. The agreement allowed Mayotte to become a "collectivité départementale", and provided for another referendum on status in ten years' time. It was approved by 72.93% of voters. A further referendum on becoming an overseas department was subsequently held in 2009.

Results

References

2000 referendums
Referendums in Mayotte
2000 in Mayotte
July 2000 events in Africa
Autonomy referendums